Shakira, Lady Caine, (née Baksh; born 23 February 1947) is a Guyanese former actress and fashion model. She is married to English actor Michael Caine.

Early life

Shakira was born on 23 February 1947 in British Guiana (present-day Guyana) to Muslim Indian parents. Her mother was a dressmaker, and she aspired to follow in her footsteps and became a fashion designer.

Modeling and acting career

At the age of 19, while working as a secretary, she was urged by her employer to enter the 1967 Miss Guyana contest, which she won. She later earned third-place in the 1967 Miss World contest held in London, where she decided to stay to launch a career in modelling.

Baksh appeared in several films, including Some Girls Do (1969), Carry On Again Doctor (1969), Toomorrow (1970), Son of Dracula (1974) and, with her husband, The Man Who Would Be King (1975). She also appeared in two episodes of the science fiction TV series UFO. She auditioned for the part of the Doctor Who companion Jo Grant, alongside third Doctor Jon Pertwee in June 1970.

Personal life

After seeing Baksh in a British television advertisement for Maxwell House coffee in 1971, Michael Caine became obsessed with finding the woman he considered to be "the most beautiful... he had ever seen." From a friend in the advertising business, he discovered that she lived only a few miles from him in London. The couple were married at the Algiers Hotel on 8 January 1973, and have one daughter, Natasha.

Baksh is a Muslim, while her husband is a Christian. He reflected to The Guardian in 2009: "My wife is a Muslim and she does Muslim stuff; I'm a Christian and I do Christian stuff, and no questions ever come up. The media view of Muslims is different from mine, which is very benign and peaceful."

References

Further reading

External links

1947 births
Living people
20th-century British actresses
British beauty pageant winners
British female models
British film actresses
British Muslims
British television actresses
Guyanese actresses
Guyanese beauty pageant winners
Guyanese emigrants to England
Guyanese female models
Guyanese Muslims
British people of Indo-Guyanese descent
Guyanese people of Indian descent
Miss World 1967 delegates
Wives of knights